The Guiyang school (also read Weiyang School) is one of the sects of Chan Buddhism.

History
The Guiyang school was the first established house of the Five Houses of Chán. Guiyang is named after master Guishan Lingyou (771–854) and his disciple, Yangshan Huiji (813–890).

Guishan was a disciple of Baizhang Huaihai, the Chan master whose disciples included Huangbo Xiyun, who in turn taught Linji Yixuan, founder of the Linji school.  After founding the Guiyang School, Yangshan moved his school to what is now modern Jiangxi.

The Guiyang school is distinct from the other schools in many ways, notably in its use of esoteric metaphors and imagery in the school's kōans and other teachings.

Lineage

Absorption into the Linji school
Over the course of Song Dynasty (960–1279), the Guiyang school, along with the Fayan and Yunmen schools were absorbed into the Linji school. Xuyun attempted to revive these absorbed lineages and succeeded in the case of the Guiyang school.

References

Further reading
 

Chan schools